Tahani Saker is a Syrian entrepreneur and the Chief Executive Officer of the Qatar-based Palma Hospitality Group. She is also the founder and Editor-in-Chief of Tahani magazine. Saker works to support education, and disadvantaged women and children. She has been honored by the United Nations Development Fund for Women (UNIFEM). In 2021, Tahani Saker founded Humanity Work, a humanitarian organization providing services to vulnerable populations.

Early life and education 
Saker was born in Damascus, she holds a PhD in International Relations and Diplomacy from the University of London, and is the first Arab woman to hold an honorary doctorate in international arbitration and negotiation in armed conflicts.

Career and philanthropy 
Prior to graduating from university, Saker completed internships at the United Nations High Commissioner for Refugees (UNHCR) in Syria. In 2010, she founded Tahani, a magazine that addresses social and cultural issues, mainly related to women empowerment and children support. After relocating to Qatar in 2012, Saker founded, and holds the position of CEO at Palma Hospitality Group. Tahani Saker is a member of the Egypt-based International Arbitration Organization since 2021. She works to promote public health and education, and to support disadvantaged women and children. In 2021 Saker founded Humanity Work, a humanitarian organization providing services to vulnerable populations, and to victims of natural, and man-made disasters.

Awards and honors 
 2018 Burj CEO Awards: Best Woman CEO in the Arab World
 2019 UNIFEM ambassador

References

Bibliography 

 
 
 

 
 
 
 
 

Syrian businesspeople
Syrian activists
Living people
Year of birth missing (living people)
People from Damascus